Rubin's Europe was a temporary exhibition at the Louvre-Lens which took place in the temporary exhibitions gallery from May 22 to the September 23, 2013, following the inaugural Renaissance exhibition. The exhibition brought together 170 works by Pierre Paul Rubens and his contemporaries, the majority of which were on loan from other museums.

Preparing the exhibition took just under two years of work. Many of the works involved come from major international museums. 
It was open to the public for four months, with 127,956 visitors attended, a little over 20,000 less than the inaugural exhibition, which was open for three weeks less. The statistics in terms of visitors were described as a "success" and "a satisfactory result", although the word of journalists and specialists were mixed, even sometimes negative, though often celebrating the quality of the works. The entrance fee was nine euros, the reduced price was eight. Rubens' Europe was replaced by The Etruscans and the Mediterranean from December 5, 2013.

The Caisse d'Épargne Nord France Europe was a “major sponsor” of the exhibition. The Exhibition was curated by Blaise Ducos.

Opening 
The opening took place on Tuesday, May 21, 2013 in the afternoon, three hundred guests attending, including Daniel Percheron and Jean-Pierre Kucheida. As well as politicians, patrons or representatives of partner museums and lenders were present.

Unlike the Renaissance exhibition, whose vast majority of works came from the Louvre, most of the works for Rubens' Europe came from other museums, including those of eight countries:
 National Library of France, Paris, France 
 Fondation Custodia, Paris, France 
 Museum of Decorative Arts, Paris, France 
 National Institute of Art History, Paris, France 
 Bonnat-Helleu Museum, Bayonne, France
 Palais des beaux-arts, Lille, France 
 Chartreuse Museum, Douai, France 
 Museum of the History of France, Versailles, France 
 Museum of Fine Arts, Marseille, France 
 Wallraf-Richartz Museum, Cologne, Germany
 Maximilianmuseum, Augsburg, Germany 
 Bayerisches Nationalmuseum, Munich, Germany 
 Alte Pinakothek, Munich, Germany 
 Skulpturensammlung und Museum für Byzantinische Kunst, State Museums, Berlin, Germany 
 Gemäldegalerie, Berlin, Germany 
 Academy of Fine Arts, Vienna, Austria
 Royal Museums of Art and History, Brussels, Belgium
 Royal Museums of Fine Arts of Belgium, Bruxelles, Belgium 
 Rubenshuis, Antwerp, Belgium 
 Royal Museum of Fine Arts, Antwerp, Belgium 
 Plantin-Moretus Museum, Antwerp, Belgium 
 Museum of Fine Arts, Ghent, Belgium 
 Musée du Prado, Madrid, Spain
 Musée Thyssen-Bornemisza, Madrid, Spain
 Palacio de Liria, Madrid, Spain
 Patrimonio Nacional, Madrid, Spain
 :es:Museo Nacional de Artes Decorativas, Madrid, Spain
 Metropolitan Museum of Art, New York, America
 Philadelphia Museum of Art, Philadelphia, America
 National Gallery of Art, Washington, America
 Musée des beaux-arts de Houston, Houston, America
 Musée des beaux-arts, Boston, America
 J. Paul Getty Museum, Los Angeles, America
 Centre d'art britannique de Yale, New Haven, America
 Musée national du Bargello, Florence, Italy
 Palais Pitti, Florence, Italy
 Musées du Capitole, Rome, Italy
 Galerie Borghèse, Rome, Italy
 Musée Teyler, Haarlem, the Netherlands
 Musée Boijmans Van Beuningen, Rotterdam, the Netherlands
 Victoria and Albert Museum, London, The UK-Uni
 British Museum, London, The UK-Uni
 National Gallery, London, The UK-Uni
 Royal Collection, London, The UK-Uni
 Ashmolean Museum, Oxford, The UK-Uni

In total, there are fifty-three lenders, mostly museums, and some collectors. The works were in seven rooms: L'Europe des cours (rooms 1 and 2), Religious emotion and baroque faith (room No.3), Ephemeral monumentality (room No.4), Rubens, emulation and competition (room No .5), Rubens and the Republic of Letters (room No.6), and The Ways of Genius (room No.7).

Bibliography

References 

 References to

External links 
 
 

Peter Paul Rubens
2013 in France
Pages with unreviewed translations
Art exhibitions in France